"The Last of His Tribe" is a poem by Australian writer Henry Kendall that was first published in The Sydney Morning Herald on 27 September 1864, under the title "Woonoona: The Last of His Tribe".

It was later included in the author's poetry collection Leaves from Australian Forests (1869), and was subsequently reprinted in various newspapers, magazines and poetry anthologies (see below).

Reception

The Oxford Companion to Australian Literature states: "In it Kendall captures the attractive nature of Aboriginal life and sentimentally mourns its passing."

Further publications 

 Leaves from Australian Forests by Henry Kendall (1869)
 Poems of Henry Clarence Kendall, (1903)
 The Golden Treasury of Australian Verse edited by Bertram Stevens (1903)
 The Children's Treasury of Australian Verse edited by Bertram Stevens (1913)
 Selections from Australian Poets edited by Bertram Stevens and George Mackaness (1913)
 Selected Poems of Henry Kendall edited by T. Inglis Moore (1957)
 "The Bulletin", 11 December 1957
 Favourite Australian Poems edited by Ian Mundie (1963)
 From the Ballads to Brennan edited by T. Inglis Moore (1964)
 The Poetical Works of Henry Kendall edited Thomas Thornton Reed (1966)
 Silence Into Song : An Anthology of Australian Verse edited by Clifford O'Brien (1968)
 The Penguin Book of Australian Verse edited by Harry P. Heseltine (1972)
 The Collins Book of Australian Verse edited Rodney Hall (1981)
 The Illustrated Treasury of Australian Verse edited by Beatrice Davis (1984)
 Cross-Country : A Book of Australian Verse edited by John Barnes (1984)
 Two Centuries of Australian Poetry edited by Mark O'Connor (1988)
 The Macmillan Anthology of Australian Literature edited by Ken L. Goodwin and Alan Lawson (1990)
 A Treasury of Bush Verse by G.A. Wilkes (1991)
 Henry Kendall : Poetry, Prose and Selected Correspondence edited by Michael Ackland (1993)
 An Anthology of Australian Literature edited by Ch'oe Chin-yong and Dynthia Van Den Driesen (1995)
 Classic Australian Verse edited Maggie Pinkney (2001)
 Our Country: Classic Australian Verse: From the Colonial Ballads to Paterson & Lawson edited by Michael Cook (2004)
 Two Centuries of Australian Poetry edited by Kathrine Bell (2007)
 An Anthology of Australian Poetry to 1920 edited by John Kinsella (2007)
 60 Classic Australian Poems for Children edited by Chris Cheng (2009)

See also
 1864 in poetry
 List of years in Australian literature
 Australian literature

References 

 

Poetry by Henry Kendall
Australian poems
1864 poems
Works originally published in Australian newspapers